Charcot Bay is a bay about  wide between Cape Kater and Cape Kjellman along the Davis Coast of Graham Land. It was discovered by the Swedish Antarctic Expedition, 1901–04, under Otto Nordenskiöld. He named it for Dr. Jean-Baptiste Charcot, at that time a noted Arctic explorer preparing for his first Antarctic expedition, on which he planned to look for Nordenskiöld whose return was overdue.

References 

Bays of Graham Land
Davis Coast